Terry Regan (born 21 May 1958) is an Australian former professional rugby league footballer who played in the 1980s. He was New South Wales Country Rugby League Player of the Year in 1981. Regan was a forward with a reputation as a hard-playing, head-on tackler.

Playing career
Regan began his rugby league career playing for Cessnock under coach Garry Johns. In 1981, Regan was named Country Rugby League Player of the Year and was selected to represent Country in the annual City-Country clash. Although playing on the losing side, Regan's efforts in that match gained the attention of the Balmain Tigers in the New South Wales Rugby League competition, the premier competition of the time. He was given a contract for the 1982 season where he played nineteen games in first-grade but also won a reserve-grade grand-final title.

Regan was offered a contract with Eastern Suburbs for the following season. In his two seasons at Easts, Regan was sent from the field on three occasions for tackling infringements.

In 1985, Regan moved to the Canberra Raiders where he was a member of the club's first semi-finals and then the first grand-final appearance in 1987. Regan played in the last twenty minutes of the grand-final, a game lost to Manly-Warringah 18–8, In 1986 Terry took up Boxing losing on points over 3 rounds to Steve Marott.

Post-playing
Regan previously coached Hillston in the Group 17 competition. He now assists his wife who trains race-horses on the New South Wales Central Coast.

Footnotes

References

External links
Terry Regan at the Rugby League Project

1958 births
Living people
Australian rugby league players
Balmain Tigers players
Canberra Raiders players
Country New South Wales rugby league team players
Rugby league players from Cessnock, New South Wales
Sydney Roosters players